John Peers and John-Patrick Smith were the defending champions but Peers decided not to participate.
Smith played alongside Ruan Roelofse and defended the title by defeating Brydan Klein and Dane Propoggia 6–2, 6–2 in the final.

Seeds

Draw

References 
 Main draw

McDonald's Burnie International - Doubles
2013 Doubles
2013 in Australian tennis